Daikichi Ishibashi ( Ishibashi Daikichi; 7 January 1932 – 26 August 2022) was a Japanese politician. A member of the Japan Socialist Party, the Social Democratic Party, and later the Democratic Party of Japan, he served in the House of Representatives from 1986 to 2000.

Ishibashi died in Matsue on 26 August 2022, at the age of 90.

References

1932 births
2022 deaths
Members of the House of Representatives (Japan)
Social Democratic Party (Japan) politicians
Democratic Party of Japan politicians
Politicians from Shimane Prefecture